Philip John Scott (born 14 November 1974) is a Scottish retired professional footballer.

After playing junior football for Scone Thistle, Perth-born Scott signed professional terms for Alex Totten's St Johnstone in 1991 after coming through the Perth youth system. Scott established himself as a mainstay in the midfields of John McClelland and Paul Sturrock. Nicknamed Fizzy, he was a member of Sturrock's 1996–97 squad that won promotion to the Scottish Premier Division.

After eight years at McDiarmid Park, Scott moved south to join English club Sheffield Wednesday for a £100,000 fee. Scott made just nine league appearances for the Owls, but scored one goal — an equaliser in a draw against Newcastle. His time at Hillsborough was plagued by injury, and he was released at the end of his contract in April 2002.

Unable to overcome his injury, Scott decided to retire from the game in 2003 at the age of 29.

References

External links

Scotland U21 stats at Fitbastats

1974 births
Living people
Association football midfielders
Scottish footballers
St Johnstone F.C. players
Sheffield Wednesday F.C. players
Footballers from Perth, Scotland
People educated at Perth Academy
Premier League players
Scottish Football League players
Scottish Premier League players
Scotland under-21 international footballers
Scone Thistle F.C. players
Scottish Junior Football Association players